Shale Gouge Ratio (typically abbreviated to SGR) is a mathematical algorithm that aims to predict the fault rock types for simple fault zones developed in sedimentary sequences dominated by sandstone and shale.

The parameter is widely used in the oil and gas exploration and production industries to enable quantitative predictions to be made regarding the hydrodynamic behavior of faults.

Definition
At any point on a fault surface, the shale gouge ratio is equal to the net shale/clay content of the rocks that have slipped past that point.  

The SGR algorithm assumes complete mixing of the wall-rock components in any particular 'throw interval'.  The parameter is a measure of the 'upscaled' composition of the fault zone.

Application to hydrocarbon exploration
Hydrocarbon exploration involves identifying and defining accumulations of hydrocarbons that are trapped in subsurface structures.  These structures are often segmented by faults.  For a thorough trap evaluation, it is necessary to predict whether the fault is sealing or leaking to hydrocarbons and also to provide an estimate of how 'strong' the fault seal might be.  The 'strength' of a fault seal can be quantified in terms of subsurface pressure, arising from the buoyancy forces within the hydrocarbon column, that the fault can support before it starts to leak.  When acting on a fault zone this subsurface pressure is termed capillary threshold pressure.

For faults developed in sandstone and shale sequences, the first order control on capillary threshold pressure is likely to be the composition, in particular the shale or clay content, of the fault-zone material.  SGR is used to estimate the shale content of the fault zone.

In general, fault zones with higher clay content, equivalent to higher SGR values, can support higher capillary threshold pressures.  On a broader scale, other factors also exert a control on the threshold pressure, such as depth of the rock sequence at the time of faulting, and the maximum burial depth.  As maximum burial depth exceeds 3 km, the effective strength of the fault seal will increase for all fault zone compositions.

References
 Yielding, Needham & Freeman, 1997. American Association of Petroleum Geologists Bulletin, vol.81, p.897-917.

See also
Fault gouge
Petroleum geology
Structural geology

Petroleum geology
Geophysics
Economic geology
Seismology